Tomislav Brkić and Nikola Ćaćić were the defending champions but chose not to defend their title.

Sergio Galdós and Orlando Luz won the title after defeating Pedro Cachín and Camilo Ugo Carabelli 7–5, 2–6, [10–8] in the final.

Seeds

Draw

References

External links
 Main draw

Internazionali di Tennis Città di Forlì - Doubles
Internazionali di Tennis Città di Forlì